Tisulsky District is an administrative district (raion), one of the nineteen in Kemerovo Oblast, Russia. As a municipal division, it is incorporated as Tisulsky Municipal District. It is located in the east of the oblast. Its administrative center is the urban locality (an urban-type settlement) of Tisul. Population:  28,471 (2002 Census);  The population of Tisul accounts for 36.1% of the district's total population.

Geography
The district is in the northeast of Kemerovo Oblast, and the Kuznetsk Basin, and covers the northern end of the Kuznetsk Alatau mountain range.  The Kuznetsk Alatau is the source of many rivers and streams that flow north to the Kiya River, and eventually the Tom River. Much of the terrain is mid-height mountains, with the southern portion of the district being part of a federally protected area, the Kuznetsk Alatau Nature Reserve.  Vegetation is mostly dark taiga (coniferous forest).The district is about 250 km east of the regional city of Kemerovo. 

Tisulsky District borders with Tyazhinsky District in the north, Krapivinsky District in the south, and with Chebulinsky District in the west.

References

Sources

Districts of Kemerovo Oblast